This is a list of notable people who were born or have lived in Derry, Northern Ireland.

Actors
 Amanda Burton - actress, best known for her role as forensic pathologist Doctor (later Professor) "Sam Ryan" in the BBC crime drama series Silent Witness
 Antonia Campbell-Hughes - actress whose films and shows include Kelly + Victor and Lead Balloon
 Roma Downey - actress, film producer and author, best known for her role as Monica, the main character of the religious TV series Touched by an Angel
 Michelle Fairley - actress, best known for her role as Catelyn Stark in the TV series Game of Thrones
 George Farquhar - Restoration dramatist
 Bronagh Gallagher - actress/singer whose films include Pulp Fiction and The Commitments
 Saoirse-Monica Jackson - actress whose work includes  Derry Girls
 Jamie-Lee O'Donnell - actress whose work includes  Derry Girls

Artists
 Willie Doherty - visual artist twice nominated for the Turner Prize
 Eilis O'Connell - sculptor
 Pádraig Timoney - visual artist

Authors
 James Burke - Science Historian and TV figure
 Willie Carson - photo journalist and author
 Joyce Cary - author; two of his novels were made into films: The Horse's Mouth (1958) starring Sir Alec Guinness and Mister Johnson (1990)
 Seamus Deane - writer
 Richard Doherty - Catholic Unionist/Royal Ulster Constabulary reservist, writer, military historian
 Seamus Heaney - poet, writer and lecturer; awarded the Nobel Prize in Literature in 1995
 Nell McCafferty - journalist, playwright, civil rights campaigner and feminist
 Eamonn McCann - journalist, civil rights campaigner, socialist and former MLA for the city
 Aoife Moore - journalist, political correspondent with the Irish Examiner

Military
 John Lawrence, soldier and Viceroy of India
Edward Leach, recipient of the Victoria Cross
John Park, recipient of the Victoria Cross
Miles Ryan, recipient of the Victoria Cross

Musicians
 Máiréad Carlin - member of Celtic Woman
 Phil Coulter - songwriter who wrote The Town I Loved So Well
 Nadine Coyle - singer from Girls Aloud
 Peter Cunnah - lead singer with 1990s pop outfit D Ream
 Dana - winner of the Eurovision Song Contest in 1970
 Neil Hannon - lead singer of The Divine Comedy
 Keith Harkin - singer and songwriter from Celtic Thunder
 Josef Locke - tenor singer, popular in the 1940s and 1950s
 Damian McGinty - tenor singer in Celtic Thunder 
 Paul McLoone- Today FM DJ and current frontman of The Undertones
 Jimmy McShane of Baltimora
 Cahir O'Doherty - member of Fighting with Wire, Jetplane Landing and Seafood
 Feargal Sharkey - lead singer of The Undertones
 SOAK - singer/songwriter

Politicians
 Martina Anderson - Sinn Féin Member of the Legislative Assembly (MLA) for Foyle
 David Baird Sr. - United States Senator from New Jersey who was born in Derry before emigrating to the U.S.
 Samuel Bell - United States Senator from New Hampshire and Governor of New Hampshire who was born in Derry before emigrating to the U.S.
 Gregory Campbell - Democratic Unionist Party Member of Parliament for East Londonderry 
 Nigel Dodds - Democratic Unionist Party Member of Parliament for Belfast North
 Brendan Duddy - Local business man and key figure in the Northern Ireland Peace Process.
 Mark Durkan - Social Democratic and Labour Party (SDLP) and former Member of Parliament for Foyle 
 Colum Eastwood - Social Democratic and Labour Party (SDLP) Leader and Member of Parliament for Foyle and Former Mayor of Derry City and former MLA for Foyle.  
 William Hay - Democratic Unionist Party, Speaker of the Northern Assembly & MLA for Foyle 
 John Hume - Nobel Peace Prize and Gandhi Peace Prize recipient, former leader of the Social Democratic and Labour Party, and MP for Foyle 1983-2005
 Elisha McCallion - Sinn Féin Senator for the Industrial and Commercial Panel
 Martin McGuinness - Deputy First Minister of Northern Ireland and Sinn Féin MP for Mid Ulster

Scientists
 J. A. Scott Kelso - neuroscientist
 William Taylor Whan - botanist
 William C. Campbell - winner of the 2015 Nobel Prize in Physiology or Medicine - biologist and parasitologist

Sportspeople
 Liam Ball - Olympic swimmer 
 Trevor Britton - cricketer
 John "Jobby" Crossan - footballer, capped 24 times by Northern Ireland, scoring 10 goals
 John Duddy - retired boxer, former holder of the IBA World Middleweight Title and the WBC Continental Americas Middleweight Title
 Darron Gibson - retired footballer, former Republic of Ireland international and Everton F.C. midfielder; first man from Derry to represent the Republic of Ireland national football team
 Ken Goodall - rugby union and league player, capped 19 times by Ireland; was selected as a replacement for the 1968 Lions tour to South Africa; changed codes and joined rugby league side Workington
 Billy "Spider" Kelly - boxer, former Commonwealth (British Empire) featherweight and British featherweight champion.
 James McClean - Wigan Athletic F.C. midfielder
 Paddy McCourt - Former Celtic F.C. midfielder
 Dwayne McGerrigle - cricketer
 Fred McMullan - former professional darts player
 Charlie Nash - boxer, former European and British lightweight champion
 Martin O'Neill - OBE recipient, former manager of Celtic Football Club, and Aston Villa F.C.
 Daniel Quigley - professional kickboxer, ISKA Professional World Heavyweight Kickboxing Champion.
 Daryl Gurney - Professional Dart Player. 2 Times PDC Major Winner

Other
 Eileen O'Donnell, model and beauty pageant winner
 Lisa McGee, stage and screenwriter
 Mark McFadden, television journalist
 Mini Ladd, Youtuber
 William Sampson, Lawyer

References

Lists of people from Northern Ireland
 
People